Amphichaetodon is a genus of marine ray-finned fish in the family Chaetodontidae, the butterflyfishes. They are native to the southern Pacific Ocean.

Species
There are currently two recognized species in this genus:
 Amphichaetodon howensis (Waite, 1903) – Lord Howe Island butterflyfish
 Amphichaetodon melbae W. E. Burgess & D. K. Caldwell, 1978 – narrow-barred butterflyfish

References

 
Chaetodontidae
Marine fish genera